Frederick Anthony Cina (February 19, 1908 – October 31, 1984) was an American lawyer and politician.

Cina was born in Aurora, St. Louis County, Minnesota. He graduated from Aurora High School in Aurora, Minnesota and received his law degree from University of Minnesota Law School in 1930. Cina served in the United States Navy during World War II. He lived in Aurora, Minnesota with his wife and family and practiced law in Aurora and Virginia, Minnesota. In 1942, Cina ran for election to the Minnesota Senate and lost the election. Cina served in the Minnesota House of Representatives from 1947 to 1968 and was a Democrat. Cina served on the University of Minnesota Board of Regents from 1969 to 1975. He died at White Community Hospital in Aurora, Minnesota.

Notes

1908 births
1984 deaths
People from Aurora, Minnesota
Military personnel from Minnesota
University of Minnesota Law School alumni
Minnesota lawyers
Democratic Party members of the Minnesota House of Representatives